Nigorigawa Caldera (Japanese: 濁川カルデラ, Nigorigawa karudera) is a volcanic crater in Oshima, Hokkaido, Japan. It has an elevation of 1,168 ft (356m) and it last erupted 12,000 years ago. The caldera has a diameter of 3km.

A town of the same name is located at the caldera. East of Nigorigawa is the town of Mori and an active volcano known as Koma-ga-take.

References 

Calderas of Hokkaido
Volcanoes of Hokkaido
Volcanic craters
Pleistocene calderas